Villa Marista is a prison in Havana, Cuba, notorious for its detention of political prisoners by the Cuban national security agency.

Its prisoners have included dissident Vladimiro Roca and politician Jesús Escandell.

Villa Marista school

Villa Marista was originally  a Catholic school for boys. Prior to the Cuban Revolution, the school was run by the Marist Brothers. After the revolutionary government expropriated the school and grounds from the Marist Brothers, the brothers were spread to other Marist schools around the world, including Miami, Florida USA, Dominican Republic, and Puerto Rico.
  
In addition to the school in Havana the Marist Brothers also had another school in the city of Cienfuegos.

References

External links
 A Visit to Villa Marista, Cuban State Security Headquarters (Video)

Buildings and structures in Havana
Prisons in Cuba